Benjamin Earl King (né Nelson; September 28, 1938 – April 30, 2015) was an American soul and R&B singer and record producer. 

He rose to prominence as one of the principal lead singers of the R&B vocal group The Drifters, notably singing the lead vocals of one of their biggest global hit singles (and only U.S. No. 1 hit), "Save the Last Dance for Me". As a soloist, King is best known as the singer and co-composer of "Stand by Me", which became a US Top 10 hit, both in 1961 and later in 1986 (when it was used as the theme to the film of the same name), and a number one hit in the United Kingdom in 1987. It was also placed on the RIAA's list of Songs of the Century. 

Besides "Stand By Me", King's songs "There Goes My Baby" and "Spanish Harlem" also appeared on the Rock and Roll Hall of Fame's list of 500 Songs That Shaped Rock and Roll. His single "Supernatural Thing" also reached the top ten on the Billboard Hot 100. King was inducted into the Rock and Roll Hall of Fame in 1988, as a member of the Drifters, and has been nominated as a solo artist. Additionally, he was inducted alongside the Drifters into Vocal Group Hall of Fame in 2000, as well as the Songwriters Hall of Fame in 2012 (solo).

Early life
Benjamin Earl Nelson was born on September 28, 1938, in Henderson, North Carolina, and moved to Harlem, New York, at the age of nine in 1947. He began singing in church choirs, and in high school formed the Four B's, a doo-wop group that occasionally performed at the Apollo Theater.

Career

The Drifters
In 1958, King (still using his birth name) joined a doo-wop group called the Five Crowns. Later that year, the Drifters' manager George Treadwell fired the members of the original Drifters, and replaced them with the members of the Five Crowns.

King had a string of R&B hits with the group on Atlantic Records. He co-wrote and sang lead on the first Atlantic hit by the new version of The Drifters, "There Goes My Baby" (1959). King sang lead on a succession of hits by the team of Doc Pomus and Mort Shuman, including "Save the Last Dance for Me", "This Magic Moment", and "I Count the Tears". He recorded only 13 songs with the two backing other lead singers and 11 lead vocal including an unreleased song called "Temptation" (later redone by Drifters vocalist Johnny Moore). The last of the King-led Drifters singles to be released was "Sometimes I Wonder", which was recorded on May 19, 1960, but not issued until June 1962.

Due to contract disputes with Treadwell in which King and his manager, Lover Patterson, demanded greater compensation, King rarely performed with the Drifters on tour or on television. On television, fellow Drifters member Charlie Thomas usually lip-synched the songs that King had recorded with the Drifters.

Solo career

In May 1960, King left the Drifters, assuming the stage name Ben E. King in preparation for a solo career. Remaining with Atlantic Records on its Atco imprint, King scored his first solo hit with the ballad "Spanish Harlem" (1961).

King's next single, "Stand by Me", written with Jerry Leiber and Mike Stoller, ultimately would be voted as one of the Songs of the Century by the Recording Industry Association of America. King cited singers Brook Benton, Roy Hamilton, and Sam Cooke as influences for his vocals of the song. "Stand by Me", "There Goes My Baby", "Spanish Harlem", and "Save the Last Dance for Me" were all named in the Rock and Roll Hall of Fame's 500 Songs that Shaped Rock and Roll; and each of those records has earned a Grammy Hall of Fame Award. King's other well-known songs include "Don't Play That Song (You Lied)", "Amor", "Seven Letters", "How Can I Forget", "On the Horizon", "Young Boy Blues", "First Taste of Love", "Here Comes the Night", "Ecstasy", and "That's When It Hurts". In the summer of 1963, King had a Top 30 hit with "I (Who Have Nothing)", which reached the Top 10 on New York's radio station, WMCA.

King's records continued to place well on the Billboard Hot 100 chart until 1965. British pop bands began to dominate the pop music scene, but King still continued to make R&B hits. Some of these hits include "What is Soul?", "Tears, Tears, Tears", "So Much Love", and "Til I Can't Take It Anymore". In 1975, King made a comeback on the top 40 Billboard Hot 100 chart with the Disco hit "Supernatural Thing". "Supernatural Thing" peaked at number 5 on Billboard Hot 100 and peaked at number 1 on the Billboard R&B Charts. It was also nominated for a Grammy at the 18th Annual Grammy Awards in 1975 for "best R&B vocal performance, male". In 1977, King collaborated with Average White Band in releasing the album Benny & Us. The album spawned two top 40 R&B hits, "A Star in the Ghetto" and "Get It Up".

King returned to the Drifters in late 1982 in the United Kingdom and sang with them until the group's break-up and reorganization in 1986. From 1983 until the band's break-up, the other members of this incarnation of the Drifters were Johnny Moore, Joe Blunt, and Clyde Brown.

A 1986 re-issue of "Stand by Me" followed the song's use as the theme song to the movie Stand By Me and re-entered the Billboard top ten after a 25-year absence. This reissue also topped the charts in the United Kingdom and the Republic of Ireland for three weeks in February 1987. The reissue also made King the first act to reach the Hot 100's top 10 in the 1950s, 1960s, 1970s, and 1980s, either as a member of an act that reached that high (in this case, The Drifters) or as a solo act that did.

In 1990, King and Bo Diddley, along with Doug Lazy, recorded a revamped hip hop version of the Monotones' 1958 hit song "Book of Love" for the soundtrack of the movie Book of Love. He also recorded a children's album, I Have Songs In My Pocket, written and produced by children's music artist Bobby Susser in 1998, which won the Early Childhood News Directors' Choice Award and Dr. Toy's/the Institute for Childhood Resources Award. King performed "Stand by Me" on the Late Show with David Letterman in 2007. Ahmet Ertegun said, "King is one of the greatest singers in the history of rock and roll and rhythm and blues."

As a Drifter and solo artist, King achieved five number-one hits: "There Goes My Baby", "Save the Last Dance for Me", "Stand By Me", "Supernatural Thing", and the 1986 re-issue of "Stand By Me". He also earned 12 Top 10 hits and 26 Top 40 hits from 1959 to 1986. King was inducted into the Rock and Roll Hall of Fame as a Drifter; he was also nominated as a solo artist.

King's "I (Who Have Nothing)" was selected for the Sopranos Peppers and Eggs Soundtrack CD (2001).

King was inducted into the North Carolina Music Hall of Fame in 2009.

On March 27, 2012, the Songwriters Hall of Fame announced that "Stand By Me" would receive its 2012 Towering Song Award and that King would be honored with the 2012 Towering Performance Award for his recording of the song.

Later life
King was active in his charitable foundation, the Stand By Me Foundation, which helps to provide education to deserving youths. He was a resident of Teaneck, New Jersey, from the late 1960s onwards.

King performed "Stand By Me" during a televised tribute to late comedian George Carlin, as he was one of Carlin's favorite artists.

On November 11, 2010, King performed "Stand By Me" at the Latin Grammys with Prince Royce.

King toured the United Kingdom in 2013 and played concerts in the United States as late as 2014, despite reported health problems.

Following a brief illness, King died at Hackensack University Medical Center on April 30, 2015, at the age of 76.

Legacy
King has been covered by acts from several genres. "So Much Love" was recorded by Dusty Springfield and many others. "I (Who Have Nothing)" was performed by Shirley Bassey in 1963 and also by Tom Jones in 1970, as well as a 1979 recording by Sylvester. "Till I Can't Take It Anymore" was revisited by peer Ray Charles in 1970 and "Spanish Harlem" was sung by Aretha Franklin in 1971. "Stand by Me" was covered by The Righteous Brothers, Otis Redding, John Lennon, Mickey Gilley, Florence + The Machine, and Tracy Chapman. The song forms the basis for the Indian hit "Dildaara" by songwriters Vishal–Shekhar. King also inspired a number of rock bands: Siouxsie and the Banshees recorded "Supernatural Thing" in 1981 and Led Zeppelin did a cover version of "Groovin'", which is better known under the title of "We're Gonna Groove".

Discography

Studio albums

Live album

Compilation albums

Singles

As lead of The Drifters

As a solo artist

References

External links
 
 

1938 births
2015 deaths
Doo-wop musicians
American male pop singers
American baritones
American soul singers
The Drifters members
Singer-songwriters from North Carolina
Singer-songwriters from New Jersey
Singer-songwriters from New York (state)
People from Teaneck, New Jersey
Atlantic Records artists
Atco Records artists
African-American male singer-songwriters
American rhythm and blues singer-songwriters
20th-century African-American male singers
21st-century African-American male singers
African-American record producers
Record producers from North Carolina